Admiral Wood may refer to:

Arthur Wood (Royal Navy officer) (1875–1961), British Royal Navy rear admiral
Andrew Wood of Largo (died 1515), Lord High Admiral of Scotland
James Athol Wood (1756–1829), British Royal Navy rear admiral
James Wood (Canadian admiral) (born 1934), Royal Canadian Navy vice admiral
Spencer S. Wood (1861–1940), U.S. Navy rear admiral

See also
William Maxwell Wood (1809–1880), Surgeon General of the United States Navy
David B. Woods (fl. 2010s), U.S. Navy rear admiral
Wilfrid Woods (1906–1975), British Royal Navy admiral